Vincent K. Becklund is a retired United States Air Force major general who last served as the director of operations of the United States Special Operations Command. Previously, he was as the deputy commander of the Air Force Special Operations Command and, prior to that, the special assistant to the commander of the same major command.

References

 

Living people
Place of birth missing (living people)
Recipients of the Defense Superior Service Medal
Recipients of the Legion of Merit
United States Air Force generals
United States Air Force personnel of the Iraq War
United States Air Force personnel of the War in Afghanistan (2001–2021)
Year of birth missing (living people)